Jovo Bakić (born 23 March 1970) is a Serbian sociologist, former politician, and an associate professor at the Faculty of Philosophy, University of Belgrade. He is primarily interested in political sociology.

Biography

Academic career
Jovo Bakić graduated from the Faculty of Philosophy in Belgrade in 1996. In 1998, he became an assistant at the same faculty in the field of sociology of politics. He received his master's degree in 2002. From 2006 until 2014, he was an associate researcher at the faculty's Institute for Sociological Research.

Bakić defended his doctoral dissertation "Development of Interpretation of the Process of the Disappearance of Yugoslavia" at the Department of Sociology at the Belgrade Faculty of Philosophy in 2009. He specialized at the Universities of Oxford, Helsinki and at the University of Massachusetts Amherst. As part of the CEEPUS program, he taught at Charles University in Prague. He has written three extensive monographs: "The European Far Right 1945-2018" (2019), "Yugoslavia: Destruction and Its Interpreters" (2011) and "Ideologies of Yugoslavia; between Serbian and Croatian nationalism 1918-1941" (2004). He has also published about thirty short studies in Serbian, English and German in scientific periodicals and collections of scientific papers. He is currently employed as an associate professor at the Faculty of Philosophy in Belgrade.

Political activity
In 2015, Bakić publicly aligned himself with Borko Stefanović after a political rift formed between Stefanović and the veteran politicians of the Democratic Party in Serbia. The split with the Democratic Party accumulated to Stefanović making his own new party in December 2015 called Serbian Left, for which Bakić significantly contributed to the initial ideological profile. Bakić's vision for the new party was such that he argued for a left-libertarian movement based on secularism, democracy, anti-capitalism, internationalism, and opposition to NATO expansion. However, Bakić did not commit to the party after disagreements arose with Stefanović on the party's strategies and politics. One of the conditions which Bakić found non-negotiable was for the party to recruit only those who were not previously active with a major political party. In response to Bakić's disagreement, Stefanović said that anyone who accepted the party's program should qualify as a member, regardless of their previous political affiliations. Vladimir Unkovski-Korica, a political science professor at the University of Glasgow, defended Bakić's refusal to commit to Serbian Left, arguing that "Borko Stefanović wants a party more like the Democratic Party in the United States, rather than like one of the leftist parties in Europe."

He became a member of the Social Democratic Union (SDU) in 2019. As the main initiator of the reorganization of the SDU, as well unification with the other minor Serbian leftist, labour and student organizations, and the merger of the SDU party into the Party of the Radical Left (PRL), in which he continued his political activities. He left the party in 2021 due to, as he stated, the "insults and moral and political lessons of some members from the top of the party." Bakić added that the presidency of the party was bothered by his criticism of Chinese imperialism, that he was accused of disrespecting the party program in public and that he was reprimanded for alleged antiziganism.

Selected works
 Bakić, Jovo. Extreme-right ideology, practice and supporters: case study of the Serbian radical party. Journal of contemporary European studies, 2009, vol. 17, no. 2, pp. 193–207. [COBISS.SR-ID 518643351]
 Bakić, Jovo. Nova Evropa : između prečanskog integralnog i hrvatskog minimalnog jugoslovenstva. U: Nedić, Marko (ur.), Matović, Vesna (ur.). Nova Evropa : 1920-1941 : zbornik radova, (Istorija srpske književne periodike, 21). Beograd: Institut za književnost i umetnost, 2010, pp. 107–122. [COBISS.SR-ID 519947415]
 Bakić, Jovo. Da li je zapadna javnost u Srbima prepoznala neprijatelja : analiza sadržaja "tanjug press crvenih biltena" : (januar 1991 - decembar 1993). Sociološki pregled, 1998, god. 32, br. 1, pp. 3–29.

See also
Party of the Radical Left

References

External links
 Jovo Bakić at ewb.rs

1970 births
Living people
Academic staff of the University of Belgrade
University of Belgrade Faculty of Philosophy alumni
Serbian sociologists
Serbian people of Montenegrin descent